The Philadelphia Bell was a franchise in the World Football League, which operated in 1974 and a portion of a season in 1975. The Bell played their home games in 1974 at JFK Stadium in South Philadelphia. The team logo was a representation of the Liberty Bell. In 1975 the team decided to stop playing at JFK and moved its games to Franklin Field.

Formation
The Bell was one of just two WFL teams that maintained the same ownership in both 1974 and 1975 (the other being Canadian millionaire John Bassett's Memphis Southmen). The group was headed by John B. Kelly Jr., a respected business and sportsman in Philadelphia and part of the well-known Kelly family, which included his sister Grace Kelly, movie star-turned-Princess of Monaco. The major money contributor behind the ownership group was John Bosacco, who came forward during the first season and took over the operations of the franchise. Bosacco believed that the WFL could survive and was instrumental in the removal of Gary Davidson as commissioner following the 1974 season.

1974 season
Led by head coach Ron Waller, the Bell appeared to be the most popular team in the fledgling league, announcing crowds of 55,534 for the home opener and 64,719 for the second home game. These figures meant that, at least on the surface, the Bell were outdrawing the NFL's Eagles, who averaged 60,030 fans for their seven home games that year. 

However, when the Bell paid city taxes on the ticket sales two weeks later, it emerged that they had inflated the gate on a scale previously unprecedented in professional sports. In an apparent attempt to pique interest, the Bell had sold block tickets to several area businesses at a discount, and in turn, many of these businesses had given away the tickets for free or at reduced prices. The actual paid attendance for the home opener had been only 13,855, and for the second game a mere 6,200 -- meaning only one-sixth of all tickets had actually been purchased. "Papergate" (as it was dubbed by the press) made both the Bell and the WFL look foolish, and proved to be a debacle from which neither recovered. 

After the scandal broke, attendance fell through the floor and never recovered. The Bell drew a total of only 62,126 fans - less than the supposed crowd for their second home game - for their last seven home games combined; if only paid fans for their first two games are included, the Bell drew a paltry average of 9,131 fans per game for the season. The nadir came on October 16, when only 750 fans found their way to JFK for a Wednesday night game played in a torrential downpour.

On the field, the Bell were mediocre: they were led by flashy quarterback King Corcoran, who had spent most of his career in the minor leagues due to his refusal to accept a backup QB slot (Corcoran had even played under Coach Waller with the Pottstown Firebirds of the recently closed Atlantic Coast Football League). Philadelphia managed only a 9–11 mark in 1974, one game behind the Charlotte Hornets for the final playoff spot - the Bell were actually 8–11 on the field, but were awarded a win by forfeit when the Chicago Fire dissolved before they could travel to Philadelphia for the season finale.

However, at the request of WFL officials, they advanced to the playoffs anyway in place of Charlotte as the Florida Blazers could sell only 1,000 advance tickets for the first round matchup in Orlando, which was nowhere near enough for the financially troubled Hornets (who had moved from New York City in mid-season) to cover their hotel and travel expenses. The Bell, in contrast, were somewhat better financed, and could cover these expenses. They traveled to Orlando, where they lost to the Blazers, 18-3, in front of less than 10,000 fans.

Season results

Playoffs

1975 season
Despite the Papergate fiasco, the Bell were reckoned as one of the WFL's stronger franchises and at least had the potential to have been successful had the league been better run. Bosacco was one of only three owners, along with the Memphis Southmen's John F. Bassett and The Hawaiians' Sam Battisone, thought to be capable of fielding a team in 1975; those three teams had been the only ones to meet payroll every week of the 1974 season.

As the 1975 season got underway, Coach Waller was replaced during training camp at Glassboro State University by future NFL Hall of Famer Willie Wood, making him the first African-American head coach of a modern pro football team.

Even on TV, the Bell couldn't get any respect. On August 29, 1975, WTAF aired a sports doubleheader, featuring a Philadelphia Wings lacrosse match followed by the Bell's game against the Southern California Sun in Anaheim. The football game was scheduled for 10:30 pm EDT, but since the Wings game ran long, viewers missed the beginning. Bell fans would miss the end of the contest, too: WTAF abruptly cut the broadcast off with six minutes remaining in the fourth quarter, pleading a "prior commitment". The station then signed off for the night at 1:30 am; the game (won by the Sun, 58-39) didn't end until 2:06 am. (According to a Philadelphia Daily News story, "keeping the final six minutes of the game on TV could have cost the Bell an estimated $5,000 in telephone line charges," so the broadcast, which the club was evidently paying for, was cut off at the three-hour mark.)

The Bell had a record of 4–7 in 1975 at the time of the league's dissolution. Attendance remained anemic, with the team's best-attended game at Franklin Field drawing barely 5,000 fans. After only 1,293 fans attended the Bell's October 18 contest, both the team and the WFL folded for good.

Vince Papale, the inspiration for the 2006 film Invincible, played wide receiver for the Bell for two seasons prior to his three years with the Philadelphia Eagles. Both Papale and King Corcoran had recently played in the Seaboard Football League, the minor league that was active at the time in the area.

Season results

References

External links
 The Philadelphia Bell WFL Football Page

 
Defunct American football teams in Pennsylvania
Bell
1974 establishments in Pennsylvania
1975 disestablishments in Pennsylvania
American football teams established in 1974
American football teams disestablished in 1975